Danio tinwini, commonly called gold-ring danio, is a newly discovered species of Danio from Myanmar.  It is also referred to as Danio sp. "TW02". It is a tiny gold fish whose body and fins are covered with blue spots. It has also been referred to as Danio sp "Ringlet" or Danio sp "Blue Ring".  It has been described by Kullander and Fang, based on collection by Mr U Tin Win, hence its species name. It is known only from the Mogaung Chaung (Mogaung stream), Myitkyina District, Kachin State, northern Myanmar. This is a tributary of the Irrawaddy River.

It is similar to D. kyathit  and D. nigrofasciatus, but can be differentiated by its smaller size, spotted (vs. striped) patterning in the unpaired fins, and much shorter barbels.

 Maximum length: .67 in /2.17 cm
 Colors: Blue, silver, gold, emerald sheen
 Temperature preference: 20–25 °C 
 pH preference: 6.5 to 7.5 
 Hardness preference: Soft to medium 
 Salinity preference: Low to medium 
 Compatibility: Good but fast like most danios
 Lifespan: Typically two to three years  
 Ease of keeping: Moderate 
 Ease of breeding: Moderate to hard

References

External links
http://ichthyologos.blogspot.com
http://www.seriouslyfish.com

Danio
Cyprinid fish of Asia
Fish described in 2009